The 1895 Amateur Hockey Association of Canada season lasted from January 3 until March 8. Each team played 8 games, and Montreal Victorias were first with a 6–2–0 record. After a required Stanley Cup challenge played between the 1894 winners, Montreal HC and Queen's, champion of the Ontario Hockey Association, the Victorias inherited the Stanley Cup as league champions.

Executive 

 Watson Jack, Victorias (President)
 A. Laurie, Quebec (1st. Vice-Pres.)
 Weldy Young, Ottawa (2nd. Vice-Pres.)
 J. A. Findlay, Montreal (Sec.-Treasurer)

Regular season

Highlights 

The Crystals suffered three straight defeats to open the season. After this, they decided independently to merge with the Montreal Shamrocks. On February 2, this new team defeated Quebec 2–1. The game was protested by Quebec and the result was cancelled and not replayed.

Another game involving Quebec was noteworthy, on February 23 against Ottawa, won by Ottawa 3–2. The game, played at Quebec, was very rough and the crowd became hostile towards the visitors. At the end of the match, the crowd pursued referee Hamilton and Umpire Findlay as they left the arena, and dragged them back to force them to declare the game a draw. Police were called to break up the demonstration. Subsequent to the match, the AHAC decided to suspend the Quebec hockey club for the rest of the season.

Final Standing

Schedule and results 

† Game void following protest by Quebec over Crystals use of ineligible players.

†† Quebec team suspended after attack on officials after game of February 23.

††† Victorias clinch league championship.

Player statistics

Goaltending averages 
Note: GP = Games played, GA = Goals against, SO = Shutouts, GAA = Goals against average

Note: Although A. Mcdougall is recorded in most hockey sources as to playing goal for the Montreal Victorias on January 12, 1895, and allowing one goal only, primary sourcing can show that Hartland MacDougall actually played goal for the Vics between January 12 and January 26  before being replaced by Robert Jones.

Leading scorers 

 Source
Coleman(1966) pp. 22–24.

Stanley Cup challenges

Montreal vs. Queen's 

On March 8, 1895, the Montreal Victorias won the 1895 AHAC title, finishing the season with a 6–2 record. Under the Stanley Cup rules, the team would also be awarded the Stanley Cup as league champions. However, the trustees ruled that a challenge between the previous year's champion Montreal HC and the squad from Queen's University, the champions of the Ontario Hockey Association (OHA), would have to be played first to determine if the Cup remained with the AHAC. Thus, it was decided that if the Montreal HC won the challenge match, the Victorias would become the Stanley Cup champions. The Montreal HC would eventually win the game, 5–1, and their crosstown rivals were crowned the champions.

Billy Barlow, the star player of Montreal was not able to play and Clarence McKerrow took his place. McKerrow had not played any games for Montreal, and could be considered a ringer, but there was no protest from Queen's. The Queen's team, although described as looking fast in their tiger jerseys, were no match for Montreal and the game proved uninteresting. Randy McLennan of Queen's would later play for Dawson City Nuggets in their 1905 challenge series against Ottawa.

Queen's U at Montreal

Referee—F. C. Chittick

Umpires—Fred McRobie and Alex Robertson

Source
Coleman(1966) pp. 24–25

Stanley Cup engravings 
While the Montreal Hockey Club won its challenge 5–1, it was not presented with the Stanley Cup.

1895 Montreal Hockey Club

1895 Montreal Victorias

 note: Jim Fenwick would leave the team at the end of the season.
 Some sources say A. MacDougall, and Hartland MacDougall each played the one game in goal. There no official records of an A. MacDougall ever playing hockey for the Montreal Victorias. So it was most likely that Hartland played both games, and an H just looked like an A. (page 22, 24 Trail of Stanley Cup Vol 1., by Charles Coleman)
.

See also 

 List of pre-NHL seasons
 List of Stanley Cup champions

References

Bibliography
 
 Podnieks, Andrew; Hockey Hall of Fame (2004). Lord Stanley's Cup. Bolton, Ont.: Fenn Pub. pp 12, 50.

Notes

Amateur Hockey Association of Canada seasons
AHAC